is a Japanese manga series written and illustrated by Takane Yonetani. It was serialized in Ren-ai Hakusho Pastel, and its individual chapters published in tankōbon volumes by Ohzora Shuppan. In the story Ayame, a university student, falls in love with Koichi, a police officer. The two fall in love and engage in sexual intercourse. Koichi's unpredictable job complicates the relationship.

It is licensed for English language release in North American release by Aurora Publishing under their "Luv Luv Press" imprint. A sequel, Make More Love & Peace, was also released and features a shoplifter wanting to have sex with Koichi.

PopCultureShock described the characters as "warm", but described the plot as "mundane romance". Johanna Draper Carlson of Comics Worth Reading says that the many sex scenes in Make Love & Peace become almost numbing.  Jason Thompson praises the characters' "almost normal relationship".

References

Aurora Publishing (United States)
2006 manga
Romance anime and manga
Ohzora Publishing manga